Askin' the Way is fifth studio album by Back Door, released in 2003 by Cultural Foundation. Featuring the original line-up of Ron Aspery, Tony Hicks and Colin Hodgkinson, the album comprises re-recordings of previously released songs and newly recorded compositions. It is the Back Door's first new material since 1976's Activate. John Fordham of The Guardian called the album "a guffawing, raw-edge cruise over a boogie bassline that makes you feel you're right there with them in the crowded pubs in which they honed this style."

Track listing

Personnel
Adapted from the Askin' the Way liner notes.
Back Door
 Ron Aspery –  saxophone, keyboards
 Tony Hicks – drums, accordion
 Colin Hodgkinson – bass guitar, vocals

Release history

References

External links 
 Askin' the Way at Discogs (list of releases)

2003 albums
Back Door (jazz trio) albums